Dax station is a railway station serving the town Dax, Landes department, southwestern France. It is situated on the Bordeaux–Irun railway and the Puyoô–Dax railway. The station is served by high speed trains to Paris, Hendaye and Tarbes, and regional trains towards Bordeaux, Bayonne and Pau.

References

External links
 

Railway stations in Landes (department)